Simunye Airfield  is an airstrip serving Simunye, a town in the Lubombo Region of Eswatini.

The marked runway has a  unpaved overrun on the northeast end.

See also
List of airports in Eswatini
Transport in Eswatini

References

External links
OpenStreetMap - Simunye
OurAirports - Simunye
FallingRain - Simunye

 Google Earth

Airports in Eswatini